The 1954 Utah Redskins football team was an American football team that represented the University of Utah as a member of the Skyline Conference during the 1954 college football season. In their fifth season under head coach Jack Curtice, the Redskins compiled an overall record of 4–7 with a mark of 3–3 against conference opponents, tying for fourth place in the Skyline.

Schedule

NFL Draft
Utah had two players selected in the 1955 NFL Draft.

References

External links
 Official game program: Idaho at Utah – October 30, 1954

Utah
Utah Utes football seasons
Utah Redskins football